Enrico Ribulsi was an Italian actor and screenwriter.

Selected filmography
 The Ferocious Saladin (1937)
 The Last Enemy (1938)
 The White Angel (1943)
 Measure for Measure (1943)
 The Gates of Heaven (1945)
 Ten Commandments (1945)
 The Testimony (1946)
 Invasion 1700 (1962)
 Arturo's Island (1962)
 The Reunion (1963)
 The Most Beautiful Wife (1970)
 The Assassin of Rome (1972)
 How to Kill a Judge (1975)

References

Bibliography
 Wagstaff, Christopher. Italian Neorealist Cinema: An Aesthetic Approach. University of Toronto Press, 2007.

External links

Year of birth unknown
Year of death unknown
Italian male television actors
Italian male film actors
Italian screenwriters
Italian male screenwriters